Bishop Cotton School may refer to:

Bishop Cotton Boys' School, Bangalore
Bishop Cotton Girls' School, Bangalore
Bishop Cotton School (Shimla), Shimla, Himachal Pradesh, India

See also 
BCS (disambiguation)